Donald Gullick (22 November 1924 – 14 April 2000) was a Welsh rugby union, and professional rugby league footballer who played in the 1950s, and coached rugby league in the 1950s and 1960s.

Personal life
Gullick was born in Pontypool district, Wales.#, following his move to play rugby in the north of England, he worked as a woodwork teacher at Ashton Grammar School, Ashton-in-Makerfield, and as a games master at Rivington Road School in St. Helens, and he died aged 75.

Playing career

International honours
Don Gullick won nine caps for Wales (RL) in 1950–53.

Final appearances
Don Gullick played left-, i.e. number 4, in St. Helens' 24-14 victory over Halifax in the Championship Final during the 1952–53 season at Maine Road, Manchester on Saturday 9 May 1953.

Challenge Cup Final appearances
Don Gullick played left-, i.e. number 4, in St. Helens' 10-15 defeat by Huddersfield in the 1952-53 Challenge Cup Final at Wembley Stadium, London on Saturday 25 April 1953.

County Cup Final appearances
Don Gullick played left-, i.e. number 4, and scored a try in St. Helens' 5-22 defeat by Leigh in the 1952 Lancashire County Cup Final during the 1952–53 season at Station Road, Swinton on Saturday 29 November 1952, and played left-, i.e. number 4, in St. Helens' 16-8 victory over Wigan in the 1953 Lancashire County Cup Final during the 1953–54 season at Station Road, Swinton on Saturday 24 October 1953.

Genealogical information
Don Gullick's marriage to Barbara E. (née Mitchem) (birth registered during second ¼ 1929 in Newport district) was registered during fourth ¼ 1950 in Caerleon district. They had children; David (birth registered during fourth ¼  in St. Helens district), and Sian (birth registered during second ¼  in St. Helens district).

References

External links
(archived by archive.is) Ex-Leigh ace Gullick dies
(archived by archive.is) Don's death is tragic loss

1924 births
2000 deaths
Footballers who switched code
Leigh Leopards coaches
Leigh Leopards players
Pontypool RFC players
Rugby league centres
Rugby league five-eighths
Rugby league locks
Rugby league players from Pontypool
Rugby league utility players
Rugby league wingers
Rugby union players from Pontypool
St Helens R.F.C. players
Wales national rugby league team players
Welsh rugby league coaches
Welsh rugby league players
Welsh rugby union players
Welsh schoolteachers